As a building Johannes Babtistæ Kirke ( John the Baptist's Church) is a former church in Landskrona, Scania, Sweden. Today it only offers outdoor services, but between around 1430 and 1753 it was the second largest church in Scania. The Church was demolished on orders of the Swedish military commendant in the town. This was due to a fear that a potential enemy could put a cannon at the top of the church tower, and then open fire on the nearby fortress Landskrona Citadel. 

In 1933 the foundations of the church were revealed and a large Christian cross of wood was put at the location of the old altar. It has since been used for outdoor services during the summer. The former church building was located in stadsparken, "the Town Park" and is locally known as Gamla kyrkans grund, "Fundament of the Old Church". Towards the end of the 18th century, the new Sofia Albertina Church was opened instead.

References

15th-century churches in Sweden
15th-century establishments in Skåne County
18th-century disestablishments in Sweden
Buildings and structures demolished in the 18th century
Buildings and structures in Landskrona
Church ruins in Sweden
Churches in the Diocese of Lund